The Garsonuiskoe mine is a large mine located in the south Russia in Zabaykalsky Krai. Garsonuiskoe represents one of the largest fluorite reserves in Russia having estimated reserves of 9.5 million tonnes of ore grading 30.6% fluorite.

References 

Fluorite mines in Russia